Culinary diplomacy, gastrodiplomacy or food diplomacy is a type of cultural diplomacy, which itself is a subset of public diplomacy. Its basic premise is that "the easiest way to win hearts and minds is through the stomach". Official government-sponsored culinary diplomacy programs have been established in Taiwan, Singapore, Thailand, South Korea, Malaysia, Indonesia, Lebanon, Peru, Israel, the United States, Cambodia, Japan, Scandinavia, Australia and Uzbekistan.

Background and definitions 
The terms "culinary diplomacy" and "gastrodiplomacy" have been in use since the early 2000s, and have been popularized by the work of public diplomacy scholars Paul Rockower and Sam Chapple-Sokol. An early mention of the concept was in a 2002 Economist article about the Thai Kitchen of the World program. In a 2011 article published in the Taiwanese journal Issues & Studies, Rockower wrote that "Gastrodiplomacy is predicated on the notion that the easiest way to win hearts and minds is through the stomach." Chapple-Sokol wrote in a 2013 article in the journal The Hague Journal of Diplomacy that culinary diplomacy is "the use of food and cuisine as an instrument to create cross-cultural understanding in the hopes of improving interactions and cooperation." Whoever the target, culinary diplomacy is meant to improve the nation brand. This is theoretically achieved by changing the conversation surrounding a country to focus on an apolitical and positive facet of its culture. In a preliminary, empirical study of the gastrodiplomacy programs of several countries, gastrodiplomacy was shown to have had success in improving the nation brand.

Culinary diplomacy versus gastrodiplomacy 
The two terms "culinary diplomacy" and "gastrodiplomacy" are used interchangeably by many, though some scholars have differentiated the terms. Rockower, for example, claims that gastrodiplomacy refers to a tool of public diplomacy, while culinary diplomacy serves as "a means to further diplomatic protocol through cuisine". Chapple-Sokol writes that both of these fall under the broad categorization of "culinary diplomacy", and differentiates between public and private culinary diplomacy. The former refers to culinary diplomacy being used as a tool of public diplomacy, and more specifically cultural diplomacy, while the latter "occurs behind closed doors", akin to Rockower's definition. However, later Chapple-Sokol went on to redefine "gastrodiplomacy" as specifically the "government-to-foreign public engagement" and one of the three pillars making up the broader culinary diplomacy.

Gastronationalism 

Gastronationalism or culinary nationalism is a related concept involving the use of food and its history, production, control, preparation and consumption as a way of promoting nationalism and national identity. It may involve arguments between two or more regions or countries about whether a particular dish or preparation is claimed by one of those regions or countries and has been appropriated or co-opted by the others. Examples of gastronationalism include efforts by state bodies, nongovernmental bodies, businesses and business groups, and individuals.

Examples

Japan 
In 2006, the Japanese Ministry of Agriculture, Forestry, and Fisheries launched “Washoku-Try Japan's Good Food,” a campaign, presenting Japanese dishes at special events held by Japanese diplomatic missions abroad. The MAFF also established the Award for Overseas Promotion of Japanese Food along with the Executive committee for the Export Strategy and Export Expansion Policy. This policy promotes seven categories of food: seafood products, rice and rice-made processed foods, forest products, flowering trees (bonsai), vegetables, beef meat and tea.

In 2010, Japan’s ministry of Japan's Ministry of Economy, Trade and Industry (METI) published the report, “Towards Nation Building through Cultural Industries,” in which methods for promoting japanese cuisine and utilizing “soft power” for national cultural industry were emphasized. The report also highlighted the importance of exporting agricultural crops, processed foods, and tableware together in the marketing of Japanese cuisine, in order to carry with it elements of Japanese “authentic culture”. In December 2013, the United Nations Educational, Scientific and Cultural Organization (UNESCO) inscribed Washoku into the Representative List of the Intangible Heritage of Humanity.

In April 2017, the Japan Food Products Overseas Promotion Center (JFOODO) was created by the Japan External Trade Organization (JETRO), with a focus on overseas markets in promoting the Japanese agricultural, forestry, and fishery products. Japanese government efforts to the promotion of washoku globally illustrates their overall commitment to gastrodiplomacy to provide a positive image of Japan.

On July 17, 2018, Japan and the European Union signed an Economic Partnership Agreement (EPA) working towards the liberalization of the agri-food market. The EPA is the biggest trade agreement ever negotiated by the EU and contains a number of provisions that will simplify trade and investment procedures and reduce export and investment related costs.

Cambodia 

In December 2020, the Ministry of Foreign Affairs and International Cooperation launched an official "Food Diplomacy 2021–2023" campaign as part of a larger economic diplomacy strategy. At the launch Minister of Foreign Affairs and International Cooperation Prak Sokhonn listed prahok, fish amok, pomelo salad, samlar kako, coconut-pineapple curry (samlar k'tis), coconut prahok dip and num banhchok as some of the Khmer dishes to be promoted in the campaign. The ministry also established a program to train Cambodian cooks for serving in Cambodian embassies and a program for providing ambassador spouses with knowledge about the Khmer cuisine.

In February 2021, the ministry published a cookbook "The Taste of Angkor" as a culinary promotion tool for Cambodian diplomatic missions abroad. A 1960 Cambodian cookbook and culinary guide "The Culinary Art of Cambodia" by Princess Norodom Rasmi Sobbhana republished in May 2021 by Angkor Database was also included in the campaign. In June 2021, a series of promotional videos under the slogan "Taste Cambodia" featuring Khmer foods and culinary activities in different Cambodian regions commissioned by the Ministry of Tourism of Cambodia were released. In May 2022, culinary training and representation facilities under the name of "Angkor Kitchen" were unveiled at the Ministry of Foreign Affairs and International Cooperation.

China 

The 1972 banquets at the Great Hall of the People on the occasion of the visit of Richard Nixon to the People's Republic of China have been described as "a signal moment of gastrodiplomacy" and gastronationalism and as "culinary and diplomatic performances writ large" by food historian Michelle T. King. King notes the success of the strategy; the New York Times published recipes to help readers recreate the banquet dishes that had been seen on television. King also notes the irony in the fact one of the dishes the Times published was adapted from a cookbook by Fu Pei-mei, Taiwan's most famous chef.

Indonesia

Indonesian cuisine has traditionally enjoyed popularity in neighbouring countries; e.g. Malaysia, Singapore and Australia, as well as nations that shares historical ties with Indonesia; such as the Netherlands, Suriname, and South Africa. It is also increasingly popular in Japan and Korea. In 2021, the Indonesian government launched the "Indonesia Spice Up The World" program as a coordinated culinary diplomacy campaign. The programme was intended to promote Indonesian cuisine abroad, to assist Indonesian culinary industry; by helping the local spice products and processed food to find their ways into the global market, and also to assist Indonesian restaurants abroad.

The "Indonesia Spice Up The World" program involves government's inter-ministerial institutions, Indonesian food industry, and also the public. The objective of the program is to boost the export value of Indonesian spices and herbs to US$2 billion, and increasing the presence of four thousand Indonesian restaurants abroad by 2024.

Israel 
In an article in the Israel Journal for Foreign Affairs, Ambassador Avi Millo described how, during his posting (1996-2001), he hosted many dignitaries including the then prime minister, Professor Radu Vasile, at his residence in Bucharest. He served traditional Jewish cuisine to his guests and used it to teach them about Israeli culture, and to develop a cordial relationship with them. These meals, he stressed, facilitated conversation, trust, and eventual cooperation between himself and his interlocutors. “In Kashrut [Jewish dietary laws],” he maintained that “Israel has an important and hitherto untapped diplomatic resource. It would behoove Israeli ambassadors serving abroad to make use of it.” On January 25, 2023, The Israel Council of Foreign Relations held an event at the Battae Ethiopian Israeli Heritage Center to celebrate Ethiopian–Israeli culture through food.

Malaysia 
Since 2010, Malaysia has undertaken a similar project by running the "Malaysia Kitchen" program. The program, carried out by the Malaysia External Trade Development Corporation, has focused most of its efforts to promote foods commonly eaten in Malaysia in Australia, United States and United Kingdom. The approach, which has employed celebrity chefs such as Rick Stein and Norman Musa in the UK, has had significant impact in increasing awareness of Malaysian–themed restaurants through product promotions and cooking demonstrations at supermarkets, food festivals and an annual night market at Trafalgar Square, London.

Peru 
An official Peruvian culinary diplomacy program started in 2011, with Peru's application for its cuisine to be included in UNESCO's list of intangible cultural heritage, the first year food heritage was recognized. Peruvian cuisine was denied the status of food heritage in its initial application. The Cocina Peruana Para El Mundo campaign has also been promoted by Peruvian chef Gaston Acurio, the owner of multiple restaurants worldwide as well as a co-creator of the documentary Perú Sabe, along with Spanish chef Ferran Adrià.

The Peruvian gastronomy is promoted by its proponents as a byproduct of Peru's multicultural national identity and what anthropologist Raúl Matta defines as the “three values embedded in Latin American neoliberal societies: cultural diversity promotion, entrepreneurship and competitiveness.” Through the strategic use of media and culinary champions, Peru has attained greater prestige for its cuisine among international food communities, which is evidenced by the country winning the World's Leading Culinary Destination award every year from 2012 to 2019. Further examples of Peru's successful use of food to influence foreign publics include the strategic opening of Peruvian restaurants in Santiago, Chile by Peruvian nationals to facilitate immigration and the economic benefits received by the Nikkei community in Lima, Peru as a result of Peru's promotion of Nikkei cuisine on the international stage.

Singapore
In recent years, Singapore launched a culinary diplomacy initiative through its embassies located in various countries around the world, to promote Singaporean cuisine.

In June 2021, South Korean convenience store chain CU announced that it has begun selling the Singaporean dish Kaya toast at all of their stores as part of their "Singapore Gourmet Trip series" in collaboration with the Singapore Tourism Board (STB).

In October 2021, Singapore's ambassador to Japan, Peter Tan, invited local organizations to the embassy residence to eat Singaporean dishes, such as Katong laksa, as a form of food diplomacy. As part of a collaboration with Japanese supermarket Seijo Ishii (:ja:成城石井), such recipes became available at a limited-time "Singapore Fair".

South Korea 

South Korea launched its own culinary diplomacy program in 2009, a $77m investment entitled "Korean Cuisine to the World" or "Global Hansik". The goals of the program, run by the Ministry of Food, Agriculture, Forestry and Fisheries, are to promote the unique nature and health qualities of Korean cuisine (hansik), as well as to increase the number of Korean restaurants worldwide to 40,000 by 2017. Projects undertaken by the Korean government include the opening of the World Institute of Kimchi, working to establish Korean cuisine as a course in internationally recognized cooking schools, and the launch of a touring Korean food truck.

Taiwan
In 2010 Taiwan launched a 20 million pound culinary diplomacy campaign which emphasized cultural elements such as Taiwan's night markets and dishes and drinks like bubble tea and oyster omelette. Taiwan has sought to use culinary diplomacy along with traditional marketing to boost its tourism sector. It also allows Taiwan to conduct diplomacy in countries it has traditionally had a challenge conducting diplomacy in due to its limited international recognition.

Thailand 
The "Global Thai" program, launched in 2002, was a government-led culinary diplomacy initiative. It aimed to boost the number of Thai restaurants worldwide to 8,000 by 2003 from about 5,500 previously. By 2011, that number had increased to more than 10,000 Thai restaurants worldwide.

The program was explained in Thailand: Kitchen of the World, an eBook published to promote the program. The point of the e-book: "In the view of the Export Promotion Department, Thai restaurants have a good business potential that can be developed to maintain a high level of international recognition. To achieve that goal, the department is carrying out a public relations campaign to build up a good image of the country through Thai restaurants worldwide."

The Department of Export Promotion of the Thai Ministry of Commerce offers potential restaurateurs plans for three different "master restaurant" types—from fast food to elegant—which investors can choose as a prefabricated restaurant plan. Accordingly, the Export-Import Bank of Thailand offered loans to Thai nationals aiming to open restaurants abroad, and the Small and Medium Enterprise Development Bank of Thailand set up an infrastructure for loans of up to US$3 million for overseas food industry initiatives, including Thai restaurants.

United States 

In September 2012, the United States officially launched its Culinary Diplomacy Partnership Initiative. More than 80 chefs, including White House Executive Chef Cristeta Comerford, former White House Executive Pastry Chef William Yosses, and Spanish-born chef José Andrés, were named to be members of the "American Chef Corps". The initiative is organized by the United States State Department Office of Protocol. One goal of the program is to send members of the Chef Corps to American embassies abroad on public diplomacy missions to teach about American cuisine.

Selected List of American Chef Corps 

José Andrés, executive chef and owner of minibar, Jaleo, Oyamel, Zaytinia, China Poblano, é, Micasa, and America Eats Tavern
Dan Barber, executive chef and co-owner of Blue Hill Restaurant and Blue Hill at Stone Barns
Rick Bayless, owner of Frontera Grill and star of PBS series Mexico: One Plate at a Time
April Bloomfield, Chef at The Spotted Pig and The Breslin, and owner of two Michelin stars
Cristeta Comerford, White House Executive Chef
Duff Goldman, Executive chef of Baltimore-based Charm City Cakes
Roland Mesnier, former White House Executive Pastry Chef 
Marcus Samuelsson, Chef and owner of Red Rooster in Harlem, New York City
Walter Scheib, former White House Executive Chef
Ming Tsai, Chef at Blue Ginger and television personality
Bill Yosses, former White House Executive Pastry Chef

The Club des Chefs des Chefs 

At the summit of culinary diplomacy is Le Club des Chefs des Chefs,  or the Leaders' Chefs' Club. Created in 1977 by Gilles Bragard, former CEO of Bragard Uniforms, the club annually brings together more than 25 chefs of heads of state to meet and discuss their work. Current club members include Executive Chef Cristeta Comerford from The White House, Chef Bernard Vaussion, formerly of the Élysée Palace, Chef Mark Flanagan, Chef to Her Majesty the Queen of the United Kingdom, and Chef Machindra Kasture, Chef to the Indian President.

The 2013 meeting of the club was hosted by White House Chef Cristeta Comerford and took place in New York City and Washington, DC. The chefs met with United Nations Secretary General Ban Ki-Moon as well as United States President Barack Obama.

The 2014 meeting of the club was hosted by Buckingham Palace chef Mark Flanagan, where the group met Queen Elizabeth II.

The 2015 meeting of the club took place in Switzerland and Italy, where the club visited Expo 2015 in Milan.

See also 
 New Nordic Cuisine
 World Institute of Kimchi

References

External links

Website by Chapple-Sokol dedicated to culinary diplomacy

Culinary diplomacy